Söngvakeppnin (known from 1986–1989 as Söngvakeppni sjónvarpsstöðva and in 1981, 1983 and 1990–2012 as Söngvakeppni sjónvarpsins, literally "The Television's Song Contest") is an annual music competition organised by Icelandic public broadcaster Ríkisútvarpið (RÚV).

Format
The contest was first organised in 1981, although neither it nor its subsequent 1983 edition were used to determine any Eurovision Song Contest representatives until Iceland made its ESC debut in 1986. Since then, RÚV has used Söngvakeppni sjónvarpsins to select the Icelandic entry, but has also used an internal selection at times, between 1995 and 1999 and in 2004, 2005 and 2021.

Söngvakeppni sjónvarpsins has consisted of a multi-artist competition, with between 5 and 10 songs competing. Most contests in the past have been a one-night event, however since 2006 the contest has consisted of a number of semi-finals aired before a grand final.

It was known for RÚV to change the performers for Eurovision. This can be seen in 1986, when winner Pálmi Gunnarsson was joined by Eiríkur Hauksson and Helga Möller to form ICY for Eurovision. In 1994 RÚV were not happy with the winning song, and so enlisted Frank McNamara to rearrange the entry and select a new singer.

Songs in Söngvakeppni sjónvarpsins were once only allowed to be performed in Icelandic. However winning songs were normally translated into English for Eurovision. This rule was abolished in 2008, when English language songs were allowed to compete for the first time.

Winners

The first 33 winners of Söngvakeppnin have gone on to represent Iceland at the Eurovision Song Contest. Iceland has never won the contest (the only Nordic country never to do so), but they have come second twice: in 1999 (when an internal selection was used), losing to Sweden, and in 2009, when they lost to Norway.

2020 was the first time in history where the winner of the contest, in this case Daði og Gagnamagnið, did not advance to Eurovision, as the event was cancelled due to the COVID-19 pandemic. Instead, RÚV internally re-selected Daði og Gagnamagnið to represent the country at the Eurovision Song Contest 2021, with the song also chosen internally.

The following table lists entries which finished fifth or higher at Eurovision:

See also
 Dansk Melodi Grand Prix
 Melodifestivalen
 Melodi Grand Prix
 Uuden Musiikin Kilpailu
 Iceland in the Eurovision Song Contest

References

External links
 

 
Eurovision Song Contest selection events
Iceland in the Eurovision Song Contest
Icelandic music
Annual events in Iceland